The Berlin International Tournament was an international ice hockey tournament held yearly in the German capital of Berlin from 1908-1910. It was the first multi-national ice hockey tournament ever organized. Princes Ice Hockey Club of Great Britain won the inaugural tournament. The German club, Akademischer SC 1906 Dresden, won the second tournament. Club des Patineurs de Paris of France won the last tournament in 1910.

Results

References

 
Ice hockey tournaments in Europe
International ice hockey competitions hosted by Germany